The Qatar International Rally (known previously as Qatar Rally, also known as International Rally of Qatar) is an international rally racing event held near the Qatari capital Doha. The rally, a gravel and sand event, dates back into the 1970s and has long been one of the cornerstone events of the Middle East Rally Championship and is one of two events (along with Dubai International Rally) to have been held in every year of the MERC.

The rally has had a group of multiple winners with local Nasser Al-Attiyah taking thirteen victories in a fourteen-year period. Emirati driver Mohammed bin Sulayem has claimed nine victories and Qatari Saeed Al-Hajri has had five wins.

List of previous winners
List of winners sourced in part from:

References

External links
Official website

Motorsport competitions in Qatar
Rally competitions in Qatar
Recurring sporting events established in 1976
Qatar